Wilhelm's Portland Memorial Funeral Home, Mausoleum and Crematory is a funerary establishment in the Sellwood neighborhood of southeast Portland, Oregon, United States. Opened in 1901 as the Portland Crematorium, it is the first and oldest crematorium west of the Mississippi River, and the largest privately managed indoor burial site in the Pacific Northwest.

History

Wilhelm's Portland Memorial Funeral Home was originally established as the Portland Crematorium on April 24, 1901, in response to the demand for crematory services in the Portland area. The Spanish Mission Revival-style mausoleum was built between 1900 and 1901, featuring whitewashed stucco walls, a tile roof, and mosaic tile doors. Frank Gibson, the secretary of the San Francisco Cremation Company, served as the first superintendent and manage of the crematory. At the time of its opening, charges for cremation were $45, and $25 for children under the age of twelve. Upon its opening, the Portland Railway, Light and Power Company operated a funeral car that could accommodate a casket as well as sitting benches for grieving family members.

In subsequent decades, the crematorium expanded into a full-fledged mausoleum. The mausoleum features numerous marble fronts on crypts which originate from quarries in Italy, while a variety of statues and other religious sculptures throughout were made by the Italian Tavarelli Studios. One of the central statuaries in the mausoleum is a replica of Michelangelo's La Pietà. Stained glass crafted by the Povey Brothers is incorporated throughout.

The original crematorium building is the Rose Chamber, grouped with several rooms below it, also named after flowers: the Lily, Daisy, Tulip, and Carnation Rooms. Various wings throughout the mausoleum take their names from religious figures as well as U.S. presidents.

Accessibility
Wilhelm's Portland Memorial Funeral Home is open to the public. Each Memorial Day, the historic private tomb of George Rae, one of the wealthiest men in Portland history, is open to the public for 90 minutes.

Notable burials

 Homer Daniel Angell, U.S. congressman
 Charlie Babb, Major League Baseball player
 Jack Beutel, actor
 William Alexander Ekwall, U.S. congressman
 William Russell Ellis, educator and politician
 Charlie High, Major League Baseball player
 Robert Denison Holmes, 28th Governor of Oregon
 Syl Johnson, Major League Baseball player
 Fielder Jones, Major League Baseball player
 Rufus Mallory, politician and lawyer
 Mayo Methot, actress
 Theodore Penland, U.S. soldier
 Charlie Swindells, Major League Baseball player
 Wayne Twitchell, Major League Baseball player
 John Yeon, architect

Gallery

See also
 Portland Memorial Mausoleum Mural (2009)

References

Sources

External links
 

1901 establishments in Oregon
Buildings and structures in Portland, Oregon
Crematoria in the United States
Death care companies of the United States
Death in Oregon
Mausoleums in the United States
Mission Revival architecture in Oregon
Sellwood-Moreland, Portland, Oregon